Rud-e Shur (also Romanized as Rūd-e Shūr, Rood Shoor, Rūd-i-Shūr, and Rūd Shūr) is a village in Rudhaleh Rural District, Rig District, Ganaveh County, Bushehr Province, Iran. At the 2006 census, its population was 183, in 32 families.

References 

Populated places in Ganaveh County